Desmophyllites is a  small desmoceratitid ammonite characterized by a smooth and very involute shell that lived during the Santonian to Maachstrictian stages of the Late Cretaceous.

Shells of Desmophylites diphylloida from the upper Santonian are on order of 1.8 cm (0.7 in) in diameter. Those of Desmophylllites larteti from the upper Campanian are on order of 10.5 cm (~4 in) across.

References
 Arkell, et al, 1957. Mesozoic Ammonoidea, Treatise on Invertebrate Paleontology, Part L (L370-371). Geological Society of America.
 Desmophyllites in Desmoceratinae

Cretaceous ammonites
Ammonites of Europe
Ammonitida